.bl is an Internet country code top-level domain (ccTLD) that was to be created for Saint Barthélemy, following the decision on 21 September 2007 by the ISO 3166 Maintenance Agency to allocate BL as the ISO 3166-1 alpha-2 code for Saint Barthélemy. This decision followed Saint Barthélemy's new status as an Overseas collectivity of France which took effect on 15 July 2007. Currently Saint Barthélemy uses Guadeloupe's ccTLD, .gp, and France's ccTLD, .fr.

See also
 ISO 3166-2:BL
 Internet in France
 .gp –CC TLD for Guadeloupe
 .fr –CC TLD for France
 .eu –CC TLD for the European Union

References

External links
 IANA .bl whois information

Country code top-level domains
Communications in Saint Barthélemy
Computer-related introductions in 2007

sv:Toppdomän#B